Bernhard Janeczek (born 10 March 1992) is an Austrian professional footballer who plays for Regionalliga club Wiener Neustädt as a centre-back.

External links
 

1992 births
Living people
Footballers from Vienna
Austrian footballers
Austria youth international footballers
Austria under-21 international footballers
Austrian Football Bundesliga players
Regionalliga players
Liga I players
Austrian Regionalliga players
Borussia Mönchengladbach II players
SV Ried players
FC Dinamo București players
SC Rheindorf Altach players
FC Blau-Weiß Linz players
SC Wiener Neustadt players
Expatriate footballers in Germany
Austrian expatriate sportspeople in Germany
Expatriate footballers in Romania
Austrian expatriate sportspeople in Romania
Association football defenders